Spell of Iron is the debut album by Finnish metal band Tarot, released in 1986 by Flamingo Music. It was released on CD in 1994 by Bluelight Records, and a remastered version was released in 2006 by Spinefarm Records.

The album includes the band's most popular song, "Wings of Darkness". Tarot's website is named after the song.

Track listing
All music written by Marko and Zachary Hietala, all lyrics by Marko Hietala.
Side one
"Midwinter Nights" – 4:35
"Dancing on the Wire" – 3:11
"Back in the Fire" – 5:38
"Love's Not Made for My Kind" – 3:28
"Never Forever" – 3:16

Side two
"Spell of Iron" – 3:32
"De Mortui Nil Nisi Bene" (instrumental) – 3:29
"Pharao" – 3:01
"Wings of Darkness" – 3:40
"Things That Crawl at Night" – 5:54

Remastered CD edition bonus tracks 
"Love's Not Made for My Kind" (1995 version) – 4:00
"Back in the Fire" (live) – 5:39
"Love's Not Made for My Kind" (live) – 3:20
"Back in the Fire" (single version) – 5:39
"I Don't Care Anymore" (demo) – 3:42
"Lady Deceiver" (demo) – 3:50
"Blood Runs Cold" (demo) – 2:49

Personnel
Tarot
 Marko Hietala – lead vocals, bass, synthesizer on track 10
 Zachary Hietala – lead guitars, backing vocals
 Mako H. – rhythm guitars, lead guitar on track 8, backing vocals
 Pecu Cinnari – drums, backing vocals

Production
Kassu Halonen – producer, synthesizer on track 4, backing vocals on track 8
Jari Laasanen – engineer, mixing
Mika Myyryläinen – reissue producer with Tarot
Janne Tolsa – reissue producer, bonus tracks engineer and mixing
Mikko Tegelman – bonus tracks engineer and mixing
Mikko Karmila – bonus tracks engineer

References 

1986 debut albums
Tarot (band) albums